Ferenc Szojka (7 April 1931 – 17 September 2011) was a Hungarian football midfielder who played for Hungary in the 1954 and 1958 FIFA World Cups. He also played for Salgótarjáni BTC. He was part of Hungary's squad at the 1952 Summer Olympics, but he did not play in any matches.

References

External links
 

1931 births
2011 deaths
People from Salgótarján
Hungarian footballers
Hungary international footballers
Association football midfielders
1954 FIFA World Cup players
1958 FIFA World Cup players
Sportspeople from Nógrád County